The 1915–16 NHA season was the seventh season of the National Hockey Association. Five teams played a 24 game schedule. Montreal Canadiens won the league championship and defeated the Portland Rosebuds to win their first ever Stanley Cup.

League business
Toronto Blueshirts included the players from the Toronto Shamrocks/Ontarios/Tecumsehs franchise. Before the season, Ed Livingstone, the Shamrocks owner, purchased the Blueshirts franchise from Frank Robinson. At the annual meeting of November 9, 1915, he was ordered to sell the Shamrocks franchise but could not do so as the Pacific Coast Hockey Association 'raided' the franchise and signed its players.

 Emmett Quinn continued as president
 Frank Calder continued as secretary-treasurer

Directors:

 Sam Lichtenhein, Ernie Russell, Wanderers
 E. J. Livingstone, Shamrocks
 Frank Robinson, M. J. Quinn, Toronto
 Barney Kane, Quebec
 George Kennedy, Canadiens
 Martin Rosenthal, Frank Shaughnessy, Ottawa

President Quinn instituted a rule that officials would be locked in their dressing rooms between periods to disallow influence from the press or players.

Regular season
Several players from the PCHA signed with NHA clubs:
 Frank Nighbor, Ottawa
 Bert Lindsay, Wanderers
 Walter Smaill, Wanderers

Highlights
On January 23, 1916, Skene Ronan was arrested by Toronto police and charged with assault for hitting Alf Skinner.

On February 23, 1916, Gordon Roberts of the Wanderers drew a match penalty for cutting Ottawa's Frank Nighbor in a game in Montreal. On the next visit of the Wanderers to Ottawa, Roberts was pelted with bottles from the Ottawa fans.

The race for the scoring championship was close between Newsy Lalonde of the Canadiens, Joe Malone of Quebec and Cy Denneny of Toronto. Lalonde finished with 31 goals in 25 games and Malone and Denneny tied for second with 26 goals. Clint Benedict of Ottawa had the best G.A.A. of 3.0 to surpass Georges Vezina's 3.2 goals per game. Gordon Keats of Toronto scored five goals in a game against Quebec on February 7, 1916, and finished the season with 22 goals in 24 games.

Final standings

Montreal was the O'Brien Cup champion by virtue of leading the league in its season.

Playoffs

The Canadiens hosted the Portland Rosebuds, champions of the Pacific Coast Hockey Association (PCHA), for the Stanley Cup.

Stanley Cup Finals

Exhibitions
After the Stanley Cup playoff, Portland and Montreal traveled to New York for two exhibition games. The teams then played two games in Cleveland. Montreal then traveled to Boston to play the winner of an exhibition series played between Ottawa, Quebec and the Wanderers.

Schedule and results

Player statistics

Scoring leaders

Leading goaltenders

See also
National Hockey Association
List of pre-NHL seasons
List of Stanley Cup champions
1915–16 PCHA season

References

Bibliography

Notes

 
NHA
National Hockey Association seasons